is a Japanese politician of the Democratic Party of Japan, a member of the House of Councillors in the Diet (national legislature). A native of Fukuoka, Fukuoka and graduate of Nihon University, he had served in the ward assembly of Shibuya, Tokyo since 1993. After running unsuccessfully for the House of Representatives in 2000, he was elected to the House of Councillors for the first time in 2001.

References

External links 
  in Japanese.

Members of the House of Councillors (Japan)
Living people
1964 births
People from Fukuoka
Democratic Party of Japan politicians
Nihon University alumni